Charles Hoy may refer to:

 Charles M. Hoy (1897–1923), American field naturalist
 Charles Sew Hoy (1836–1901), New Zealand merchant, Chinese leader and gold-dredger